The First United Methodist Church is a historic church east of the junction of 2nd Street and 5th Avenue in Lockesburg, Arkansas.  It is a T-shaped structure, with a single-story nave and an asymmetrical -story cross section at the rear of the building.  It is framed in wood and clad in brick.  Built in 1926, it is the fourth church building to serve a congregation formally established in 1872, and is a particularly well-preserved example of a Gothic Revival structure with Classical and Medieval Revival elements.  This distinctive combination of elements is rare in Arkansas church architecture.

The church was listed on the National Register of Historic Places in 1994.

See also
National Register of Historic Places listings in Sevier County, Arkansas

References

United Methodist churches in Arkansas
Churches on the National Register of Historic Places in Arkansas
Gothic Revival church buildings in Arkansas
Churches completed in 1926
Churches in Sevier County, Arkansas
National Register of Historic Places in Sevier County, Arkansas